Anthony Jasmin sometimes Anthony & Jasmin is a Danish pop duo who on 28 March 2014 won season 7 of the Danish version of X Factor in 2014. After Anthony Lopez and Jasmin Dahl were eliminated as solo artists at bootcamp, the duo was formed and mentored by Thomas Blachman. They reached the final and won against Lucy, mentored by Remee, becoming the first ever duo or group formation to win the Danish title.

Their debut single "Do Ya" topped Tracklisten, the official Danish Singles Chart immediately following their win. They were the first duo or group formation that won the Danish title. In June 2014, the duo released their EP Stick Together through Sony with tracks including the winning song "Do Ya" and the new title track single "Stick Together".

One of the duo, Anthony, competed in the Dansk Melodi Grand Prix 2017 with the song "Smoke In My Eyes," but did not advance to the superfinal.

Members
Anthony Jasmin is a duo named after the first names of its members. They are:
Anthony Lopez, from Valby, 19 at time of application, student at CPH West school. Before X Factor, he had appeared with several smaller groups and released materials online through his YouTube channel. 
Jasmin Dahl, from Høje Gladsaxe, 15 at time of application, student, mixed Faroe Islands / Sudanese origin

Performances during X Factor

Discography

EPs
2014: Stick Together

Singles

References

Danish musical duos
The X Factor winners
X Factor (Danish TV series) contestants
Year of birth missing (living people)
Living people